Acapulco is a Spanish and English-language comedy television series created by Austin Winsberg, Eduardo Cisneros, and Jason Shuman, inspired by How to Be a Latin Lover (2017). The series premiered on Apple TV+ on October 8, 2021. In March 2022, the series was renewed for a second season, which premiered on October 21, 2022. In January 2023, the series was renewed for a third season.

Cast

Main

 Eugenio Derbez as Maximo Gallardo Ramos, a successful mogul living in Malibu who has a rags to riches story (present day)
 Enrique Arrizon as Maximo Gallardo Ramos, a working-class young man who has dreamed of working at Las Colinas Resort and works as a pool boy (1984)
 Erick Saldaña as Young Maximo Gallardo Ramos (1974)
 Fernando Carsa as Gullermo (Memo), a working-class young man and best friend of Maximo who works in laundry at Las Colinas Resort (1984)
 Carsa also plays Memo's son in the present day.
 Hemky Madera as an older version of Memo in the present day.
 Damián Alcázar as Don Pablo Bonilla, Head of Operations at Las Colinas Resort who Maximo idolises since he also has a rags to riches story, he also becomes a mentor of Maximo and Memo. He is the father of Victor, ex-husband of Carmen and grandfather of Mariano (1984)
 Daniel Fuentes Lobo plays a younger version of Don Pablo (known just as Pablo) (1949)
 Alcázar also plays the 1964, 1967 and 1981 versions of Don Pablo.
 Camila Perez as Julia Gonzalez, a receptionist at Las Colinas Resort, girlfriend of Chad and potential love interest of Maximo (1984)
 Perez also plays the 1981 version of Julia.
 Chord Overstreet as Chad Davies, a General Manager at Las Colinas Resort, boyfriend of Julia and son of Diane (1984)
 Overstreet also plays the 1981 version of Chad.
 Vanessa Bauche as Nora Gallardo Ramos, the widowed mother of Maximo and Sara who works as a cleaner, potential love interest of Emilio and Esteban and future abuela of Hugo (1984)
 Bauche also plays the 1964, 1967, 1974 and the older present day version of Nora Ramos.
 Gala Komori as Nora Ramos (1949)
 Regina Reynoso as Sara Gallardo Ramos, Maximo's sister and future mother of Hugo (1984)
 Bianca Marroquín as Older Sara Gallardo Ramos, sister of Maximo and mother of Hugo (present day)
 Raphael Alejandro as Hugo, nephew of Maximo and future son of Sara (present day)
 Jessica Collins as Diane Davies, current owner of Las Colinas Resort, former soap opera actress, author, fitness guru and entrepreneur and mother of Chad (1984)
 Collins also plays the 1967 and 1981 versions of Diane
 Rafael Cebrián as Hector Valero, head pool boy at Las Colinas Resort who is cocky but knows how to fleece the guests (1984)
 Carlos Corona as Esteban, a handy-man resident who lives at the same place the Gallardo Ramos's live and potential love interest of Nora (1984)

NOTE
Unless otherwise stated, most characters in the show are set in 1984 Acapulco, Mexico

Recurring

 Will Sasso plays Joe, present day's Maximo's driver and bodyguard
 Regina Orozco as Lupe, head of laundry at Las Colinas Resort (1984)
 Carolina Moreno plays young Lupe (1949)
 Lobo Elias as Beto, a bartender at Las Colinas Resort (1984)
 Elias also plays the 1981 version of Beto
 Julian Sedgwick as Rolf, Maximo's butler in Malibu (present day)
 Rodrigo Urquidi as Augusto
 Rossana de Leon as Adriana
 Ricardo Cañamar as Javier, one of Las Colinas Resort's poolside singers (1984)
 Sofia Ruiz as Monica, one of Las Colinas Resort's poolside singers (1984)
 Ruiz also plays the 1981 version of Monica.
 Erick Zavala as Emilio, owner of a record store and potential love interest of Nora (1984)
 Marco Terán as Eduardo
 Jessica Balsaneli as Sestina
 Eliana Jones as Becca Rosenthal, Maximo's first "wife" who he met and had a fling with at Las Colinas Resort who was vacationing with her parents from New York (1984)
 Samantha Orozco as Gabriela (5 episodes)

Guest stars
 Sally Pressman as Mrs. Bennett, a guest as Las Colinas Resort who take a shining to Maximo and friend of Diane (1984) ("Pilot")
 Steve Monroe as Mr. Bennett, a guest as Las Colinas Resort who take a shining to Maximo and friend of Diane (1984) ("Pilot")
 Caleb Foote as Jessie, a guest as Las Colinas Resort who Maximo helps (1984) ("Jessie's Girl")
 Simon Templeman as Bronte de Fils, a guest at Las Colinas Resort a fashion designer and owner of a modelling agency and friend of Diane (1984) ("Invisible Touch")
 Juan Pablo Espinosa as Rodolfo, a singing superstar and guest at Las Colinas Resort (1984) ("Crazy Little Thing Called Love")
 Jeff Meacham as David, Rodolfo's manager and guest at Las Colinas Resort (1984) ("Crazy Little Thing Called Love")
 Gillian Vigman as Marcia Rosenthal, a rich New Yorker vacationing at Las Colinas Resort with her husband Barry and daughter Becca. ("Uptown Girl")
 Kevin Kilner as Barry Rosenthal, a rich New Yorker vacationing at Las Colinas Resort with her wife Marcia and daughter Becca. ("Uptown Girl")
 Alizée Gaillard as Yvonne, co-owner of Las Colinas Resort (1949) ("Time After Time")
 Marco Zunino as Don Antonio, Head of Operations at Las Colinas Resort (1949) ("Time After Time")

Episodes

Series overview

Season 1 (2021)

Season 2 (2022)

Production

Development
In December 2020, Apple gave a series order for Acapulco, created by Austin Winsberg, Eduardo Cisneros, and Jason Shuman with inspiration from the 2017 film How to Be a Latin Lover. Winsberg is said to be the showrunner, along with Chris Harris, who are both executive producing along with Shuman, Cisneros, Eugenio Derbez, Benjamin Odell, Eric Tannenbaum, and Kim Tannenbaum.

Originally, Gaz Alazraki was set to executive produce and direct the pilot episode, but in March 2021, it was reported that Richard Shepard would instead direct the pilot.

The series premiered on Apple TV+ on October 8, 2021. On March 4, 2022, Apple renewed the series for a second season, which premiered on October 21, 2022.

On January 30, 2023, Apple renewed the series for a third season.

Casting
When the series was ordered in December 2020, Eugenio Derbez was announced as headlining. In March 2021, Enrique Arrizon, Raphael Alejandro, Damián Alcázar, and Camila Perez joined the cast. Additionally, Jessica Collins, Chord Overstreet, Vanessa Bauche, Rafael Cebrián, Fernando Carsa, and Regina Reynoso joined in April 2021.

Filming
Production began on April 7, 2021, in Puerto Vallarta, Mexico, and wrapped filming on June 20, 2021.

Reception

References

External links
 

2020s American comedy television series
2021 American television series debuts
Apple TV+ original programming
Spanish-language television shows
English-language television shows
Television shows set in Acapulco
Television shows filmed in Mexico
Television series by Lionsgate Television
Live action television shows based on films